The Harvard Crimson men's squash team is the intercollegiate men's squash team for Harvard University located in Cambridge, Massachusetts. The team competes in the Ivy League within the College Squash Association. It is the second oldest squash team in the country, only after Yale. The university first fielded a team in 1923, under the leadership of head coach Harry Cowles. Harvard squash is arguably the most prestigious program in the country, with 42 national titles since 1942. The current head coach is Mike Way. The assistant coaches are Luke Hammond and Hameed Ahmed, while the strength and conditioning coach is Beth Zeitlin.

History 

 2014, 2019, 2020, 2022 National Champion

Year-by-year results

Men's Squash 
Updated February 2022.

Players

Current roster 
Updated February 2023.

|}

Notable former players 
Notable alumni include:
 Siddharth Suchde '07, Highest world ranking of 39, 4x All-American and 4x All-Ivy, 2007 Individual National Champion
 Ali Farag '14, Current world no. 2, 22 PSA titles, 3x All-American and 3x All-Ivy, 2012 and 2014 Individual National Champion, 2018 World Champion, degree in mechanical engineering
 Victor Crouin '22, Current world no. 9, 3 PSA titles, 3x 1st team All-American and 3x 1st team All-Ivy, 2019 and 2022 Individual National Champion, Skillman Award winner, degree in economics

References

External links 
 

 
Sports clubs established in 1924
College men's squash teams in the United States